Elizabeth Soshkina (1889–1963) was a Soviet geologist and palaeontologist.

Early life 
Elizabeth D. Soshkina was born in 1889 in Ryazan, Russian Empire. She was schooled at the Women's Gymnasium, Ryazan from 1909, graduating with a gold medal. She continued her education with studies of physics and mathematics at the Moscow Higher Women's Courses (now Moscow State University) from 1916–1918, while working as a teacher from 1913–1922 in Moscow.

Career 
Soshkina became an Assistant Professor teaching geology at Moscow State University from 1919–1930, but her primary area of research became palaeontology. Her department was moved to the Moscow Institute of Geological Expedition in 1930 and she taught there until 1942, when she took up a research position at the Petroleum Institute studying corals. She later moved to the Institute of Mineral Resources in Moscow.

Soshkina joined the staff of the Palaeontological Institute from 1942–1956. She taught the Devonian and Silurian corals of the Soviet Union, describing them and their ecological processes. She was a member of the Volga-Bashkir Expedition of the Russian Academy of Sciences between 1941–1943, which studied oil deposits in the Urals for the war effort. She gained her doctoral degree in 1946 on the Devonian corals of the Urals. She was appointed a Professor in 1948 and continued her research into Palaeozoic rugoses.

She retired in 1956 and returned to Ryazan. Elizabeth Soshkina died in 1963.

References 

Soviet paleontologists
1889 births
1963 deaths
Academic staff of Moscow State University